Celovečernji the Kid (trans. Featuring the Kid) is the second studio album released by Serbian and former Yugoslav singer-songwriter Đorđe Balašević.

The album is perhaps best remembered for the songs "Blues mutne vode", "Lunjo", and the ballads "Neko to od gore vidi sve" and "Svirajte mi Jesen stiže, dunjo moja" (the former referring to folk song ""), "Celovečernji The Kid" and "Don Francisco Long Play" feature the same mariachi-inspired music, "Celovečernji The Kid" featuring Serbian and "Don Francisco Long Play" featuring English language lyrics.

Track listing
All songs written by Đorđe Balašević.
"Celovečernji The Kid" (Featuring The Kid) – 3:19
"Vi ste jedan običan miš" (You Are But An Ordinary Mouse) – 3:36
"Crni labud" (Black Swan) – 3:40
"Blues mutne vode" (Muddy Water Blues) – 3:59
"Svirajte mi 'Jesen stiže, dunjo moja'" (Play 'The Autumn Is Coming, My Dear' To Me) – 5:21
"Don Francisco Long Play" – 3:21
"Medena vremena" (Honey Times) – 3:41
"Lunjo" (Hey, Tramp) – 4:01
"Nikad kao Bane" (Never Like Bane) – 4:38
"Neko to od gore vidi sve" (Someone Sees It All From Up Above) – 4:32

References
 EX YU ROCK enciklopedija 1960–2006, Janjatović Petar;

External links
Celovečernji The Kid at Discogs

1983 albums
Đorđe Balašević albums
PGP-RTB albums